51 Orionis is a single star in the equatorial constellation of Orion. It has the Bayer designation b Orionis, while 51 Orionis is the Flamsteed designation. This object is visible to the naked eye as a faint, orange-hued star with an apparent visual magnitude of 4.90. It is located approximately 299 light-years away from the Sun based on parallax, and is drifting further away with a radial velocity of +88 km/s.

This is an aging giant star with a stellar classification of K1III, having exhausted the supply of hydrogen at its core and expanded to 19 times the Sun's radius. It is four billion years old with 1.11 times the mass of the Sun. The star is radiating 132 times the Sun's luminosity from its enlarged photosphere at an effective temperature of 4,458 K.

References

K-type giants
Orion (constellation)
Orionis, b
BD+01 1105
Orionis, 51
037984
026885
1963